The Supreme Court of Mississippi is the highest court in the state of Mississippi. It was established in the first constitution of the state following its admission as a State of the Union in 1817 and was known as the High Court of Errors and Appeals.  The court is an appellate court, as opposed to a trial court.  The Court Building is located in downtown Jackson, Mississippi, the state capital.

History
The constitution of 1832 provided for a "High Court of Errors and Appeals," to consist of three judges to be elected, one from each of the three districts into which the legislature should divide the State. Section 3 reads: "The office of one of said judges shall be vacated in two years, and of one in four years, and of one in six years; so that at the expiration of every two years, one of said judges shall be elected as aforesaid." The title of the tribunal was changed by the constitution of 1869 to the "Supreme Court of Mississippi" and the judges were appointed by the governor with the advice and consent of the Senate. The provisions of the constitution of 1869 were perpetuated in the constitution of 1890.

Jurisdiction

The jurisdiction of the court is mandated by statute.  The court has exclusive jurisdiction, for example, over reviewing capital punishment cases.  The Mississippi Court of Appeals, the state's other appellate court, was created by the legislature (Miss. Code Ann. § 9-4-1, effective September 6, 1994) to assist the high court in managing a large caseload.  The Court of Appeals generally handles criminal cases and cases concerning family law issues, though its jurisdiction is also mandated by statute.  All cases submitted for appellate review in the state are filed in the Supreme Court, which then re-directs the appropriate cases to the Court of Appeals and retains the cases over which it has exclusive jurisdiction.  After the Court of Appeals makes its ruling, aggrieved parties in certain types of cases there may seek further review from the Mississippi Supreme Court by petitioning for a Writ of Certiorari.

Court composition
The court was expanded over time to a total of nine justices—one chief, two presiding, and six associate justices.  Generally, the justices are elected for eight-year terms, with staggered election years, from three geographical districts (three judges per district) to ensure fair representation.  However, it is common for the governor to appoint a justice to fill a seat vacated by the death or retirement of a justice.  If less than half of the term remains, the appointee serves the remainder of the term. If more than half of the term remains, the appointee may serve until a special election is held. Seniority of the justices is determined by length of time in office.  The chief justice is the current justice who has been in office the longest, and the presiding justices are next two in seniority.

Districts
The Supreme Court of Mississippi is separated into three districts, with three Justices elected from each. They are separated by county lines, as follows.

District 1

Bolivar
Claiborne
Copiah
Hinds
Holmes
Humphreys
Issaquena
Jefferson
Kemper
Lauderdale
Leake
Madison
Neshoba
Newton
Noxubee
Rankin
Scott
Sharkey
Sunflower
Warren
Washington
Yazoo

District 2

Adams
Amite
Clarke
Covington
Forrest
Franklin
George
Greene
Hancock
Harrison
Jackson
Jasper
Jefferson Davis
Jones
Lamar
Lawrence
Lincoln
Marion
Pearl River
Perry
Pike
Simpson
Smith
Stone
Walthall
Wayne
Wilkinson

District 3

Alcorn
Attala
Benton
Calhoun
Carroll
Chickasaw
Choctaw
Clay
Coahoma
DeSoto
Grenada
Itawamba
Lafayette
Lee
Leflore
Lowndes
Marshall
Monroe
Montgomery
Oktibbeha
Panola
Pontotoc
Prentiss
Quitman
Tallahatchie
Tate
Tippah
Tishomingo
Tunica
Union
Webster
Winston
Yalobusha

Justices

Composition of the court

References

External links
 Official website
Map: 

Mississippi
Mississippi state courts
1817 establishments in Mississippi
Courts and tribunals established in 1817